Heartless City is a 2013 South Korean television series starring Jung Kyung-ho, Nam Gyu-ri and Lee Jae-yoon. It aired on JTBC from May 27 to July 30, 2013 on Mondays and Tuesdays at 23:00 (KST) time slot for 20 episodes.

Synopsis
This noir/crime drama revolves around the love and struggles of undercover agents and members of the nation's largest drug ring.

When Lee Kyung-mi (Go Na-eun) is murdered by drug lords, her mentee and friend Yoon Soo-min (Nam Gyu-ri) is recruited by Kyung-mi's boyfriend (Lee Jae-yoon) to try and catch the prime suspect, a mysterious figure only known to be called "The Doctor's Son" (Jung Kyung-ho). In a fateful encounter, Soo-min falls for The Doctor's Son, not realizing who he is. Unbeknownst to her and every other police officer, The Doctor's Son is also an undercover agent. Working under the orders of police director Min Hong Ki (Son Chang-Min), The Doctor's Son works to take down the Busan drug ring and seek revenge against the dealers who were responsible for his mother's drug addiction.

Cast

Main
 Jung Kyung-ho as Jung Shi-hyun ("The Doctor's Son") - Grew up in a red light district / brothel until his mom died from drug-overdose. Then ran away from an orphanage (to Jin-sook) and eventually became a drug courier for "Uncle" Safari. Shi-hyun is nicknamed "The Doctor's Son" and became the boss of a mid-sized gang. Highly ambitious. He is plotting to take over the position of "Scale", his drug supplier. 
 Sung Yoo-bin as Shi-hyun (young)
 Lee Jae-yoon as Ji Hyung-min - Hyung-min graduated from the police academy with top scores and gets promoted at a young age. Was studying law to join the Prosecutor's office, but returned to the police force to avenge an undercover officer's death. Now the section chief of a special investigation unit, his goal is to take down "Scale", which leads him to Shi-hyun.
 Nam Gyu-ri as Yoon Soo-min - Soo-min grew up in an orphanage with Kyung-mi, and they treat each other like real sisters. When Kyung-mi is killed in the line of duty, Soo-min goes undercover to catch her friend's killer and finish what Kyung-mi started. However, she ends up falling for "The Doctor's Son", the drug lord Kyung-mi was investigating until her untimely death.
 Son Chang-min as Min Hong-ki, Director of the police / special investigative unit.
 Kim Yoo-mi as Lee Jin-sook, President / CEO for various adult entertainment establishments. Worked the streets at a younger age. Close friend to Shi-hyun's mom. Looked out for Shi-hyun as he was growing up. Along with Soo, they both support and follow Shi-hyun's direction / quest to take over the drug distribution channel.
 Choi Moo-sung as Moon Deok-bae ("Safari") - Knew Shi-hyun as a child. Paths did not cross again until he was sent down to Busan to pursue "Doctor's Son". Taught / gave Shi-hyun a switchblade knife when he was younger (this became Shi-hyun's weapon of choice).
 Yoon Hyun-min as Kim Hyun-soo - Met Shi-hyun in prison and both worked under "Halibut". At times, hot headed but loyal to a fault.

Supporting
 Go Na-eun as Lee Kyung-mi, an undercover agent. She is Hyung-min's girlfriend and Soo-min's older sister. She grew up with Shi-hyun at the orphanage and is hinted that she is Shi-hyun's love interest, she later on died after being shot in the head by a sniper during an undercover mission to catch "Doctor's Son" who happened to be Shi-hyun.
 Park Soo-young as chief of detective squad
 Kil Yong-woo as Ji Man-hee, Attorney general and Hyung-min's father
 Kim Byeong-ok as Jeoul ("Scale"), Head of the narcotics ring (drugs, loan sharking, adult entertainment establishments). Leader behind the scenes for "Halibut" and "Meth Kim".
 Kim Jung-hak as Ahn Kyung-chan, prosecutor
 Song Min-ji as Cha Hyo-joo, reporter
 Jung Soo-young as Oh Jung-yeon, prosecutor
 Kim Jong-goo as Jo ("Busan") aka "Chairman"
Leader of Busan gang.
 Jung Ji-soon as Jo Ha-neul
Son of "Busan".
 Park Young-ji as Cha
Lawmaker and Hyo-joo's father.
 Jung Moon-sung as Shi-hyun's subordinate
 Kim Min-sang as Kim Bbong ("Meth")
 Kim Hyo-sun as Eun-soo
 Lee Moo-saeng as Detective Kim
 Shim Min as Joo-young
Soo-min's friend since kindergarten.
 Kim Jae-hwa as Park Eun-ae

Original soundtrack
The soundtrack digital single "Hurt" was sung by Kim Yong-jin of pop group Bohemian. Its repetition every episode followed the dark noir theme of the series.

International broadcast
 It aired in Vietnam on HTV2 from August 4, 2015, under the title Sống trong tội ác.
 It aired in Thailand on MONO Plus (in a network of MONO29) from March 5 to May 8, 2016, under the title Fị rạk meụ̄xng khæ̂n.

References

External links
  
 
 

Korean-language television shows
2013 South Korean television series debuts
2013 South Korean television series endings
JTBC television dramas
South Korean crime television series
South Korean thriller television series
Television series by Doremi Entertainment